Tetracoccus is a plant genus under the family Picrodendraceae. Shrubby-spurge is a common name for plants in this genus. They are dioecious, often hairy shrubs.

It was first described in 1885 by Charles Christopher Parry. Its name means, from Greek "four seed" (tetra meaning "four" and kokkos, "kernel, grain").

Distribution
The genus is native to the southwestern United States and northern Mexico, with species in desert or chaparral habitats.

Species
Species include:
 Tetracoccus capensis  (I.M.Johnst.) Croizat — endemic to  Baja California Sur state (México).
 Tetracoccus dioicus  Parry — endemic to the Peninsular Ranges in northwestern Baja California state (México); and southern California (U.S.) within San Diego, Orange, and Riverside Counties.
 Tetracoccus fasciculatus  (S.Watson) Croizat — Mexico (Chihuahua, Durango, Nuevo León, and Puebla states).
 Tetracoccus hallii   Brandegee  — Mojave Desert and Sonoran Desert in California, Nevada, and Arizona (U.S.), and Baja California state (México). Sometimes treated as a variety under T. fasciculatus.
 Tetracoccus ilicifolius  Coville & Gilman — endemic to Death Valley National Park, in the Mojave Desert and eastern Inyo County, California.

See also
 Taxonomy of the Picrodendraceae

References

External links

Picrodendraceae
Malpighiales genera
Flora of Northeastern Mexico
Flora of Northwestern Mexico
Flora of the Southwestern United States
Taxa named by George Engelmann
Taxa named by Charles Christopher Parry
Dioecious plants